Amblycorypha insolita, known generally as the Big Bend oblong-winged katydid or Big Bend false katydid, is a species of phaneropterine katydid in the family Tettigoniidae. It is found in North America.

References

External links

 

Phaneropterinae
Articles created by Qbugbot
Insects described in 1914